Loretto is an unincorporated community in Essex County, in the U.S. state of Virginia.

Brooke's Bank, Elmwood, Port Micou, Vauter's Church, and Wheatland are listed on the National Register of Historic Places.

References

Unincorporated communities in Virginia
Unincorporated communities in Essex County, Virginia